Thomas W. Fleming House, also known as the Clubhouse of the Women's Club of Fairmont, is a historic home located at Fairmont, Marion County, West Virginia.  It was built in 1901, and is a -story, "U"-shaped, stucco masonry building in a Colonial Revival / Beaux-Arts style.  It has a rectangular central block that is joined at the rear by two short wings. It features rounded, glass-enclosed entrance solarium. It became the clubhouse of the Fairmont Woman's Club in 1938. Its builder, Thomas W. Fleming (1846-1937), served two terms as mayor of Fairmont and was elected to the House of Delegates in 1905.

It was listed on the National Register of Historic Places in 1979.

References

External links
Woman`s Club of Fairmont website

Beaux-Arts architecture in West Virginia
Women's club buildings
Clubhouses on the National Register of Historic Places in West Virginia
Colonial Revival architecture in West Virginia
Houses completed in 1901
Houses in Marion County, West Virginia
Houses on the National Register of Historic Places in West Virginia
National Register of Historic Places in Marion County, West Virginia
History of women in West Virginia